Mac and Me is a 1988 American science fiction film co-written (with Steve Feke) and directed by Stewart Raffill. Starring Christine Ebersole, Jonathan Ward, and Tina Caspary alongside Lauren Stanley and Jade Calegory, it centers on a "Mysterious Alien Creature" (MAC) that escapes from nefarious NASA agents and befriends a boy named Eric Cruise. Together, they try to find MAC's family, whom he has been separated from.

The film flopped at the box office and was panned by critics, partly due to plot lines similar to E.T. the Extra-Terrestrial (1982), as well as its elaborate product placement of McDonald's and Coca-Cola. It was nominated for four Golden Raspberry Awards and won Worst Director and Worst New Star (for Ronald McDonald). However, it received four Youth in Film Awards (now Young Artist Awards) nominations. While regarded as one of the worst films ever made, it has become a cult film. Due to its poor reception, Orion Pictures cancelled the planned sequel.

Plot
A family of aliens on a dying desert planet search for subterranean water to drink through a straw. A NASA research probe lands and begins taking atmospheric samples via a suction device. The aliens are accidentally sucked into the apparatus and the probe returns to Earth. The aliens escape from a government base with their ability to manipulate electricity and destroy anything they touch. While three of them run off into the desert, the smallest one breaks away and hides in a passing minivan occupied by single mother Janet Cruise and her two sons (younger son Eric, who uses a wheelchair, and elder son Michael) who are moving to a new home near Los Angeles following the loss of her husband. Shortly after the move, Eric suspects the alien's presence. The next morning, he finds that its has trashed most of the new house and learns its identity, but Janet blames both him and Michael for what has happened. After noticing the alien, Eric tries to catch up to him, but ends up rolling down a hill and falls into a lake, where he nearly drowns, but is rescued by the alien. He is not believed at all when he tries to tell his family about its actions.

Later that night, he sets a trap with the help of his new friend, Debbie, who had also seen the alien. They trap him inside a vacuum cleaner, which malfunctions and causes the entire neighborhood to suffer a power surge. After the alien is released, Michael now believes Eric, but it leaves before Janet can be convinced. Eric's behavior toward it, which he names MAC (short for "Mysterious Alien Creature") changes after he fixes all of the damage he made to the house, and leaves behind several newspaper clippings that Eric believes are an attempt to communicate. Meanwhile, FBI agents Wickett and Zimmerman track MAC down and begin spying on the Cruise residence. Eric disguises MAC in a teddy bear suit and takes him to a birthday party at a local McDonald's, where Debbie's older sister, Courtney, works. Wickett and Zimmerman follow, but MAC starts a dance number as a distraction and escapes with Eric on his wheelchair. After Wickett and Zimmerman chase them through a nearby neighborhood and shopping mall with additional help, they are rescued by Michael and Courtney. Janet, having witnessed the chase while in the mall, catches up to Wickett and Zimmerman and inadvertently learns from Wickett that MAC is indeed real.

Eric, Michael, Debbie, and Courtney decide to help reunite MAC with his family, who are lost in the desert without sustenance. Following MAC's directions, they travel to the mountains on the outskirts of Palmdale, where they find his dying family and rejuvenate them with Coca-Cola. The group stops at a gas station and goes to a nearby supermarket. The restless aliens climb out of the minivan and enter the supermarket, causing a panic. After MAC's father steals a gun from a security guard, the police arrive and a shootout takes place in the parking lot, which ends with an explosion that destroys the supermarket and Eric being killed by a stray bullet. Once Wickett, Zimmerman, and Janet arrive by helicopter, MAC and his family use their powers to revive Eric. For saving his life, the United States government grants them American citizenship, with the Cruise family and their neighbors, as well as Wickett and Zimmerman, in attendance at the ceremony. MAC's family, in Earthling clothing, drives off in a pink Cadillac, and MAC blows a gum bubble that reads "We'll be back!"

Cast

In addition, Jennifer Aniston and Nikki Cox appear as uncredited background extras.

Puppeteers
 Allen Coulter
 Steven James
 Frank Charles Lutkus III
 David Matherly
 David Arthur Nelson
 Loren Soman
 Christopher Swift
 N. Brock Winkless IV

Production

Development
Producer R. J. Louis had previously worked on advertising campaigns with McDonald's and had an association with their charitable arm Ronald McDonald House Charities (RMHC). He explained that at the time Ronald McDonald was "even more [well-known] than Santa Claus", but that E.T. was close behind and thus felt that the next "generation" needed an E.T. of their own. Louis was required to negotiate the rights to use the McDonald's brand and its elements within the film. He pitched the project as a cross-promotional endeavor which could be promoted at its restaurants, and with its profits helping to support RMHC.

Some have reported that the film was—at least partially—financed by McDonald's, which Louis denies. However, he did receive funding from Golden State Foods, a food service distributor closely associated with McDonald's; Louis had encountered its CEO in his efforts to pitch the film and was attracted by its charitable goals. Despite McDonald's specifying that they did not want Ronald McDonald to appear in the film, he nonetheless appeared in a scene set at a McDonald's which featured an extended dance sequence. The character also appeared in the theatrical trailer.

Louis noted that he was one of the first to leverage the chain as a platform for promoting films (Disney would later enter into a long-term deal with McDonald's to cross-promote properties including their classic films through in-store campaigns such as Happy Meals, although that relationship ended in May 2006, amid pressure to reduce the promotion of junk food to children).

Despite this, Louis remarked that he was "still the only person in the universe that ever had the exclusive motion picture rights to the McDonald's trademark, their actors, their characters and the whole company."

Stewart Raffill
Stewart Raffill, who had made a number of family films, was brought on as director even before the film had a completed script. He says he was recommended to the producer by James Brolin, with whom Raffill had made 1981's High Risk.

Raffill later recalled:
I was hired out of the blue. And the producer asked me to come down to the office. So I did and he had a whole crew there, a whole crew on the payroll. It was amazing. He had the transportation captain. The camera department head. The AD. The Production Manager. He had everybody already hired and I said, "Well, what's the script?" And he said, "We don't have a script. I don't like the script. You have to write the script. You're gonna have to write it quickly so prep the movie and write the script on the weekends."

The crew aimed to distinguish the film from E.T. by having Mac be a member of a family and having powers and skills.

Raffill says the producer wanted to use an actor who was handicapped. "So he found a kid who had spina bifida. The kid had never acted before, but he was a wonderful kid. But when they finished it was as if the fact that they used a real encumbered person to play the person didn't mean anything to even the people who lived in the world." Raffill says "the moment Disney heard we had this deal with McDonald's, they went in and hammered out a three-year deal to get all their toys put in their Happy Meals and have that relationship with Coca-Cola. As such, the McDonald's people were then not particularly enthused with us as they now had Disney, but they had to fulfill their arrangement with us."

Filming
In one scene, Eric Cruise (played by Calegory, who has spina bifida and uses a wheelchair in real life) is seen rolling down a hill in his wheelchair. Raffill noted that he performed a portion of the stunt himself, explaining that "it's very hard to do physical things when you're in that condition. It's very hard to make a wheelchair work because it's not a very balanced thing. When you start going fast in a wheelchair, you place tremendous risk on the child, so you have to try and figure out how to do that in a controlled fashion."

The shooting of Eric was explicitly shown in the Japanese VHS release of the film. For the film's mainstream release in theaters and on home video, this scene was cut from the test screening phase of the film following negative reactions from test audiences; the altered version made it so that Eric would die offscreen.

Music
Soundtrack
The film's soundtrack album was released by Curb Records, featuring one track from its musical score, composed, and conducted by Alan Silvestri, and the theme song "Take Me (I'll Follow You)" by Bobby Caldwell.

Track listing:
 "You're Not a Stranger Anymore (Theme from Mac and Me)" - Jara Lane (3:42) 
 "Take Me (I'll Follow You)" - Bobby Caldwell (5:32) 
 "You Knew What You Were Doing (Every Inch of the Way)" - Marcy Levy (3:30) 
 "Down to Earth" - Ashford & Simpson (5:27) 
 "Waves" - Debbie Lytton (3:44) 
 "Send Out a Signal" - Larry Hart (4:31) 
 "Wait and Break My Heart Tomorrow" - The Flint River Band (4:40) 
 "Overture (Theme from Mac and Me)" - Alan Silvestri (4:24)

Score
In 2014, Quartet Records released a limited edition disc (1000 copies) of Silvestri's complete score. The disc also includes "You're Not a Stranger Anymore (Theme from Mac and Me)" and "Take Me (I'll Follow You)," which Silvestri co-wrote for the film.

Reception and legacy

Box office
The film premiered in Hong Kong on August 5, 1988, with a United States release following on August 12. A box office bomb, it grossed $6,424,112 in the U.S. against a $13 million budget. It had a profit-sharing arrangement with Ronald McDonald House Charities.

Critical response
Upon release, the film was panned, due to its imitations of numerous concepts from Steven Spielberg's E.T. the Extra-Terrestrial (1982). Los Angeles Times critic Michael Wilmington wrote that it is "an amazingly bald-faced copy of E.T., even though this is E.T. in a sticky wrapper, left under the heater two hours too long. Almost everything in the earlier movie has a double here." Richard Harrington of The Washington Post amended the famed "E.T., phone home" phrase to "E.T., call lawyer" and said, "Why is it so hard to like this film? Having seen it done so much better by Spielberg doesn't help, of course."

The contrivance of the "Mysterious Alien Creature" being referred to by the acronym "MAC" (a seemingly innocuous reference to the McDonald's hamburger called the "Big Mac", as well as a dance number featuring mascot Ronald McDonald), and the characters' wearing of McDonald's clothing, prompted Deseret News journalist Chris Hicks to declare: "I'm not sure I've ever seen a movie that is as crass a 90-minute commercial as Mac and Me". Hicks, along with Caryn James of The New York Times, observed additional promotion of Coca-Cola and Sears—the latter brand carried McKids, the McDonald's line of children's clothing. James also took exception to the "awfully irresponsible" treatment of wheelchair-using main character Eric Cruise, who is placed in potentially dangerous situations before MAC intervenes. Calegory's lead performance was named a highlight of the film by several critics, and the filmmakers garnered praise for their use of a disabled protagonist.

On review aggregator Rotten Tomatoes, with 28 reviews, the film has a 7% approval rating, and an average rating of 3.4/10. The site's consensus reads, "Mac and Me is duly infamous: not only is it a pale imitation of E.T., it's also a thinly-veiled feature length commercial for McDonald's and Coca-Cola". On Metacritic, the film has a score of 26 out of 100 based on 12 critics, indicating "generally unfavorable reviews". 

The film is widely regarded as one of the worst films ever made, with The Telegraph noting that it is "frequently pulled out in 'worst film of all time' arguments". Filmmaker Morgan Spurlock cited it as the most egregious example of product placement in cinema history, as well as the "worst thing you'll ever see in your entire life". It was also named the worst film ever in the San Francisco Chronicle, as well as by broadcaster Simon Mayo and writer/producer Damon Lindelof. Michael Hayden of GQ India referred to it as "hands down the worst family movie in Hollywood history."

Nathan Rabin reviewed the film as part of his "My Year of Flops" series for The A.V. Club, writing:

In popular culture
It has nevertheless become a cult film. Lindelof allowed that it is "the fifth-best alien comedy ever made," and it has appeared in various "so-bad-it's-good" listings. Jim Vorel of Paste ranked it no. 52 in "The 100 Best 'B Movies' of All Time" (noting that it cannot be "enjoyed un-ironically"), while Cracked journalist Jeff Steinbrunner placed it at no. 1 in "The 10 Most Shameless Product Placements in Movie History", calling it "unintentionally awesome" and "almost genius." Complex wrote: "As an accidentally riotous failure, Mac and Me comes highly recommended, but its real purpose requires a line of shot glasses...everyone must take a shot whenever Raffill's film displays one of its countless product placements."

The film is part of a running gag by actor Paul Rudd. When appearing as a guest on Late Night with Conan O'Brien, O'Brien's later show Conan, and O'Brien’s podcast Conan O'Brien Needs a Friend, Rudd would perform a "bait-and-switch" by routinely showing the same clip from it (in which Eric Cruise, watched by MAC, loses control of his wheelchair and falls down a hill into a lake) instead of showing clips from the actual films he was ostensibly promoting. While giving an interview alongside Captain America: Civil War costar Chris Evans in 2016, Rudd expressed his appreciation of its "blatant" advertising of McDonald's, "unearned" positioning of Bobby Caldwell ballad "Take Me (I'll Follow You)", and inclusion of a fly landing on MAC's nose, declaring: "I love it...it's so good." Evans also professed to "love" the film, noting that he "grew up on it."

The film is one of six movies featured in Season 12 of Mystery Science Theater 3000.

The podcast How Did This Get Made? reviewed the movie in Episode 10, featuring guest host Adam Pally.

Cancelled sequel
A sequel was announced at the time of the film's release. It ends with the text "We'll be back!", but given its unpopularity, a sequel did not happen. Producer R.J. Louis spoke of the ending in a 2017 interview and did not rule out a sequel. He claimed there is public interest because home video sales have made the film profitable for Orion Pictures, and also said that MAC would resonate with modern, young moviegoers.

Accolades

See also
 List of films considered the worst
 My Little Bossings, a 2013 Filipino family comedy film similarly criticized for product placement
 Nukie, a South African knockoff of E.T. released one year prior to Mac & Me

References

External links
 
 
 Mac and Me at the TCM Movie Database
 
 

1980s adventure films
1980s children's fantasy films
1980s children's films
1980s English-language films
1980s science fiction comedy films
1988 comedy films
1988 films
1988 independent films
Alien visitations in films
American adventure comedy films
American children's comedy films
American independent films
American science fiction comedy films
Fictional duos
Films about extraterrestrial life
Films about paraplegics or quadriplegics
Films directed by Stewart Raffill
Films scored by Alan Silvestri
Films set in California
Films shot in Los Angeles
Mockbuster films
Orion Pictures films
Sponsored films
Golden Raspberry Award winning films
1980s American films